"The Only Love" is a ballad performed by the Bee Gees, It was written and produced by Barry Gibb, Robin Gibb and Maurice Gibb, lead vocals by Barry Gibb. Released on their 1991 album High Civilization.

Recording
"The Only Love" was originally offered by Barry to Kelli Wolfe, but he then replaced it with a song he wrote specifically for her, "Born to Be Loved by You".

This track sounds like an extended Barry verse welded to the type of big singalong chorus that Robin and Maurice always favored, Its lyrics are well put and under the circumstances he seems entitled to the over-the-top repeats at the song's finish. This song was originally offered to Bryan Adams, though he declined their offer.

Release
It was released as a single only in Europe, the B-side was a previously unreleased live version of "You Win Again", recorded in Melbourne, Australia during their 1989 "One For All World Tour". The song did not chart in the UK and America, but it reached #31 in Germany. The sleeve art for the single was a photo collage that included an image of Maurice’s daughter Samantha right in the center.

"The Only Love" was only performed during the 1991 High Civilization Tour. It was covered by Ana Gazzola in Portuguese.

Personnel
 Barry Gibb — lead vocal, guitar
 Robin Gibb — harmony vocal
 Maurice Gibb — keyboards, synthesizer, guitar
 Alan Kendall - guitar
 Tim Moore — keyboards, synthesizer, programming
 George "Chocolate" Perry — bass
 Lenny Castro — percussion

References

1991 singles
Bee Gees songs
Songs written by Barry Gibb
Songs written by Robin Gibb
Songs written by Maurice Gibb
Song recordings produced by Barry Gibb
Song recordings produced by Robin Gibb
Song recordings produced by Maurice Gibb
1991 songs
Warner Records singles
Pop ballads